Karsavran is a village in Tarsus district of Mersin Province, Turkey. The population of village is 123  as of 2011. Main economic activity is farming. Cotton and various vegetables and produced. Çukurova Airport construction site is to the west of the village.

References

Villages in Tarsus District